Oleksandr Klymenko (born 19 December 1975) is a Ukrainian former cyclist.

Major results

2000
2nd National Time Trial Championships
2001
2nd National Time Trial Championships
2002
1st  National Road Race Championships
1st Overall Tour of Japan
1st Stage 3
1st Overall Bałtyk–Karkonosze Tour
1st Stage 5
2003
 1st Overall Bałtyk–Karkonosze Tour
1st Stage 7
3rd Overall Course de la Solidarité Olympique
2004
3rd Overall Bałtyk–Karkonosze Tour
2005
1st Grand Prix Palma
2006
3rd Tour de Ribas

References

1975 births
Living people
Ukrainian male cyclists
UCI Track Cycling World Champions (men)
Ukrainian track cyclists